Jaitpur is a village and a Gram panchayat under Barahiya Tehsil in Lakhisarai district of Bihar, India.  It is situated on the bank of river Ganges at a distance of 3.5 km from Barahiya, 15.5 km from Lakhisarai and 117 km distance from Patna.

Demographics
Jaitpur has a population of more than 5000 in which 95% belong to the Bhumihar community. In Jaitpur 80% of people are educated. The main occupation of village is agriculture and business, There are many temples in this village such as Shri Thakur Lakshmi Narayan Temple, Maa Kali Temple, Shiv Temple etc. In the village there is a High School where curious students come from various villages of the district to get education till 12th standard. Jaitpur village is the one of the most powerful villages of that area.

Transportation
Jaitpur is well connected to other cities in India via the NH 80 which passes through this village. The Gangasari Halt Railway station is very near to the village. The main railway station is Barahiya which is just about two kilometers away from the village.

Education
The village consists of two government schools where students from the neighbor villages come for studies. Along with the Government school, there are many private schools in this village where Brahman Scholars give their precious knowledge to students for better understanding of life and religion and own dharma and karma. After getting the primary education from this village, students get admission in various universities in India such as JNU, New Delhi, EFL University, Hyderabad, IIT, ITI, Law Universities and many other universities and colleges in India or World. In this village 80% people are educated and have a clear vision towards their life.

Infrastructure
Jaitpur has a post office and a bank. There is also a Lakshmi Narayan temple locally known as 'Thakurbadi'.

References

Cities and towns in Lakhisarai district